Mopa is a village in Pernem, Goa in India. The Manohar International Airport is located at Mopa. Mopa Airport Terminal 2 will be built by 5 August 2023.

References

External links

Villages in North Goa district

[[Category: Mopa Airport | Manohar International Airport Goa]]